Achita is a large crater on Ceres.

The crater is named after Achita, a Nigerian god of agriculture. The crater was imaged as part of NASA's Dawn mission. The probe showed that Achita has mass-wasting ridges on the floor and is the fourth oldest crater on Ceres having been formed 570 million years ago.

References

Impact craters on asteroids
Surface features of Ceres